Cris Ericson (born May 16, 1952) is an American marijuana legalization activist and perennial candidate for public office in Vermont. She has unsuccessfully run for the governorship of Vermont nine times and for a seat in the United States Congress eight times.

Early life

Cris Ericson was born in Washington, D.C., on May 16, 1952. From 1970 to 1971, she attended Goddard College. In 1976, she graduated from the University of Massachusetts Amherst with a bachelor of arts degree.

Career

Vermont elections

During the 2002 Vermont gubernatorial election Ericson was one of four independent candidates and ran under the Make Marijuana Legal party line. In the general election she placed fourth behind Jim Douglas, Doug Racine, and Cornelius Hogan.

During the 2004 Vermont gubernatorial election she ran as an independent under the Marijuana party line. In the general election she placed third behind Douglas and Peter Clavelle.

She ran for governor of Vermont in 2006, 2008, 2010, 2012, 2014, and 2018.

In 2020, she ran for the gubernatorial, lieutenant gubernatorial, attorney general, treasurer, secretary of state, and auditor nominations of the Vermont Progressive Party. The Vermont Progressive Party sought volunteers to run in the primaries and for party members to write-in David Zuckerman in the gubernatorial primary and Doug Hoffer in the auditor general primary to prevent Ericson from winning. She was able to appear on the ballot due to lower ballot access requirements instituted due to COVID-19. She was defeated by Zuckerman, who won as a write-in candidate, in the gubernatorial primary. However, she won the Progressive nominations for lieutenant governor, auditor, secretary of state, attorney general, and treasurer. Ericson called for a recount in the gubernatorial primary.

United States Congress

During the 2004 United States Senate election in Vermont Ericson ran under the Marijuana party line and placed third behind Patrick Leahy and John A. McMullen.

During the 2006 United States Senate election in Vermont she ran for the Republican nomination, but was defeated by Richard Tarrant. In the general election she ran as an independent and placed third behind Bernie Sanders and Tarrant.

References

External links
 
 Ballotpedia: Cris Ericson

Living people
American cannabis activists
Cannabis in Vermont
Cannabis political party politicians
Vermont politicians
1952 births
Vermont Independents
Vermont Republicans
Vermont Democrats
Candidates in the 2010 United States elections
Candidates in the 2012 United States elections
Candidates in the 2014 United States elections
Candidates in the 2016 United States elections
Candidates in the 2016 United States Senate elections
Candidates in the 2018 United States elections
Candidates in the 2020 United States elections
Candidates in the 2022 United States Senate elections